In Middle Chinese, the phonological system of medieval rime dictionaries and rime tables, the final is the rest of the syllable after the initial consonant.
This analysis is derived from the traditional Chinese fanqie system of indicating pronunciation with a pair of characters indicating the sounds of the initial and final parts of the syllable respectively, though in both cases several characters were used for each sound.
Reconstruction of the pronunciation of finals is much more difficult than for initials due to the combination of multiple phonemes into a single class, and there is no agreement as to their values.
Because of this lack of consensus, understanding of the reconstruction of finals requires delving into the details of rime tables and rime dictionaries.

Finals and rhyme classes
Each final is contained within a single rhyme class, but a rhyme class may contain more than one final:
 Several rhyme classes contain both "open" and "closed" finals, thought to be distinguished by the absence or presence of a medial /w/.
 Some so-called chóngniǔ rhyme classes contain two finals after a labial, velar and laryngeal initials, one placed in row 3 and the other in row 4.  (The finals are not distinguished after dental or sibilant initials, and scholars disagree on which of the two finals these should be allocated to.) In all such cases, the paired finals have identical outcomes in all modern Chinese dialects as well as in Sino-Japanese borrowings, and are generally palatalized; with sporadic exceptions. However, in Sino-Vietnamese and Sino-Korean only the row-4 finals have such palatalization.  Karlgren ignored the difference, but all modern linguists consider the distinction important, though they do not agree on its realization.  Li's and Baxter's transcriptions adopt a convention of using /ji/ the row-4 finals in contrast to /j/ or /i/ for the row-3 finals.

Classes of finals
Karlgren noticed that classes of finals from the rime dictionaries were placed in different rows of the rime tables.
As three classes of final were confined to the first, second and fourth rows respectively, he named them finals of divisions I, II and IV.
The remaining finals he called "division-III finals" because they occurred in the third row of the tables.
Some of these (the "pure" or "independent" division-III finals) occurred only in that row, while others (the "mixed" finals) could also occur in the second or fourth rows with some initials.
Karlgren disregarded the chongniu distinction, but later workers have emphasized its importance.
Li Rong, in a systematic comparison of the rhyme tables with a recently discovered early edition of the Qieyun, identified seven classes of finals.
The table below lists the combinations of initial and final classes that occur in the Qieyun, with the row of the rime tables in which each combination was placed:

The mixed and chongniu finals, though designated as division-III finals, are spread across rows 2 and 4 as well as row 3 of the tables.
To handle these cases, a distinction is made between the row that the homophone class is placed in and the "division" of its final.  This article distinguishes rows by Arabic numerals 1 2 3 4 and divisions by Roman numerals I II III IV.  In addition, chóngniǔ finals in division III are notated in the table of final outcomes below as III/3 or III/4, depending on the row in which they occur.

Significance of the division
There are correspondences between certain divisions and the presence or absence of medial glides in later dialects, in ways that differ depending on the class of the initial (e.g. velar, labial, retroflex, etc.).  There are also clear co-occurrence restrictions between initials and divisions, in that initials from certain of these same classes can occur with finals only from certain divisions.  The LMC authors of this system appear to have been aware of these classes of initials, and seem to have determined the separation into divisions partly on the basis of the co-occurrence relationships and partly on the medial glides, although it is debated how the exact classification was made.  It is important to remember that the authors of this system were attempting to use LMC phonology to reconstruct EMC phonology (although they probably thought of it more in terms of trying to harmonize the way that words were normally pronounced with the rather different system of rhymes and homophones as laid out in the Qieyun).

The clearest difference is between division III and other divisions, with division III generally corresponding to palatal initials and/or finals with palatal (i.e. high-front) vowels or glides. In addition, divisions I and IV allow exactly the same set of initials in EMC, suggesting that the distinction between the two postdates the EMC period. Beyond this, there is no consensus.

Karlgren, and many authors following him, suggest that neither divisions I nor II had any medial other than /w/ or /u/, with division I corresponding to back vowels and division II to front vowels.  Some authors have suggested that division II corresponded not so much to front vowels as to centralized vowels.  Many authors have recently suggested that division-II syllables consistently had a medial /r/ in Old Chinese, although this appeared to have already disappeared by EMC, so it's unclear exactly how this would have been carried forward into LMC. (Some have suggested that the system of divisions dates back at least to the time of the Qieyun (c. 600 AD), and reflects a medial  present very early on in the EMC period.)

Table of Early Middle Chinese finals
The following table lists Early Middle Chinese (EMC) reconstructed "finals" (i.e. all of the syllable other than the initial consonant), according to different authors. It also lists the corresponding Late Middle Chinese (LMC) outcomes according to Pulleyblank, and the Standard Mandarin outcomes using Pinyin spelling. Some columns are not strictly in IPA.

Late Middle Chinese (LMC) outcomes

Codes for initial classes:
G = guttural (velar or laryngeal, i.e. a back consonant)
P = labial (includes labiodental)
PG = labial or guttural (i.e. a grave consonant)
A = acute consonant (anything not in PG)
SR = EMC retroflex sibilant
ST = alveolar sibilant
M = /m/
RXLʔ = EMC retroflex, EMC palatal sibilant, /l/ or /ʔ/

Standard Mandarin outcomes

The modern outcomes are listed using the following codes:
P = bilabial stops (p, b)
PM = bilabials (p, b, m)
F = labiovelars (f, w < /m-/)
T = alveolar stops (t, d)
S = alveolar sibilants (c, z, s)
Š = retroflex sibilants (ch, zh, sh)
ŠR = retroflex (ch, zh, sh, r)
K = velars (k, g, h)
Q = palatal sibilants (q, j, x); they occur in place of either velars or alveolar sibilants when i or ü follows
G = gutturals (velars or no initial; in the latter case, stemming from MC ʔ- or ŋ-/ng- and sometimes written w- or y- in Pinyin)
J = "jutturals" (same as gutturals but with palatal sibilants in place of velars; occurs before i or ü)

The outcomes are written either as individual outcomes in Pinyin, or combined outcomes in "pseudo-Pinyin" (when the outcome begins with a "-" or uppercase letter).  "Pseudo-Pinyin" uses Pinyin conventions but without any of the abbreviations normally in use in Pinyin.  Examples:
"-uei" indicates the pronunciation , normally spelled -ui or wei
"-üe" indicates the pronunciation , normally spelled -ue (after q-, j-, x-); -üe (after l-, n-); or yue
"-i" indicates the pronunciation  (usually , but  after alveolar or retroflex sibilants); normally spelled -i or yi

When not indicated, the choice of whether a velar or palatal occurs is determined by the following vowel: palatals before -i or -ü, velars elsewhere.

Example: A listed outcome like -uo, Ge, PMo; also Ta, occ. wo means that the outcome is -e for a guttural (i.e. ge, ke, he, e); -o for a labial (i.e. po, bo, mo); -uo elsewhere; but for alveolar stops, -a also appears (i.e. either tuo, duo or ta, da), and wo occasionally appears instead of e as the outcome of MC ʔ- or ŋ- (the outcome of both is a "null initial", which is counted as a "guttural" in the modern outcomes).

These outcomes assume the normal correspondences between EMC initials and Standard Mandarin initials:
EMC voiced stops and fricatives become unvoiced in Mandarin; stops in syllables with tone 1 become aspirated, otherwise unaspirated.
EMC palatal sibilants and retroflex stops become Mandarin retroflex sibilants.
EMC nasal changes: nr- becomes Mandarin n-; ny- becomes Mandarin r-, or sometimes the syllable er; ng- is dropped.
EMC guttural  is dropped, and h- is dropped in the sequence hj-.
EMC velars and alveolar sibilants become Mandarin palatal sibilants before Early Mandarin -i- or -ü-.
With certain finals, EMC labial stops become Mandarin f-, and EMC m- usually becomes Mandarin w-; this is indicated by F-.  Lowercase f- appears in finals where EMC labial stops become Mandarin f-, but either there are no known examples of EMC m- with the same final, or EMC m- with that final becomes Mandarin m- rather than w-.

In a couple of situations where two different EMC initials have merged, the modern outcome is nonetheless different depending on the EMC initial:
EMC retroflex and palatal sibilants merged in LMC, but sometimes the modern outcomes are different.  For example, under -ip, the notation -i, Še < SR- means that EMC  >  but EMC  > .
EMC ng- and ʔ- both disappear, but sometimes with different results.  For example,  means that the modern result is ya when the EMC syllable began with ʔ- but ai when the EMC syllable began with ng- .  On the other hand, -ao, ao < ʔ-, Jiao means that the modern result is ao when the EMC syllable began with ʔ- but yao when the EMC syllable began with ng-  (since J- includes original velars); likewise for -uo, wo < ʔ-, Jüe, indicating wo vs. yue.

Zero coda

Palatal glide coda

Labial-velar glide coda

Labial codas

Dental codas

Velar codas

Notes

References 
Footnotes

Works cited

 
 
  See also List of Corrigenda.

External links 
 Introduction to Chinese Historical Phonology, Guillaume Jacques
 Historical Chinese Phonology/Philology at Technical Notes on the Chinese Language Dialects Dylan W.H. Sung

Middle Chinese